HMS Gravelines was a  of the Royal Navy. She was named after the Battle of Gravelines, which took place in 1588, resulting in the English Navy defeating the Spanish Armada. Gravelines was built by Cammell Laird of Birkenhead. She was laid down on 10 August 1943, launched on 30 November 1944 and completed on 14 June 1946.

Service
Upon commissioning, Gravelines was placed in Reserve along with a number of her other sister-ships. In 1949, Gravelines joined the 3rd Destroyer Flotilla, which joined the Mediterranean Fleet. Gravelines exchanged crews with the destroyer  on 10 March 1953 and returned to the UK where she was paid off into the Reserve Fleet.

In 1955, Gravelines, with the rest of the 3rd Flotilla, returned once again to the Mediterranean, and was in the area during the Suez Crisis, which had occurred in response to the Egyptian President Nasser's nationalisation of the Suez Canal. That same year, Gravelines returned to a colder climate, when she, along with the rest of the Flotilla, joined the Home Fleet, based in the UK. In 1957, Gravelines began a refit, though it was cancelled the following year. Gravelines arrived for scrapping at Rosyth on 4 April 1961.

References

Publications

 

Battle-class destroyers of the Royal Navy
Ships built on the River Mersey
1944 ships
Cold War destroyers of the United Kingdom